Mexico competed in the 2022 Central American and Caribbean Beach Games in Santa Marta, Colombia from November 19 to 26, 2022.

On November 15, 2022, sailor Elena Oetling was named as the country's flag bearer during the opening ceremony.

Medalists 

The following Mexican athletes won medals at the games.
|  style="text-align:left; width:78%; vertical-align:top;"|

|  style="text-align:left; width:22%; vertical-align:top;"|

Competitors 
The following is the list of number of competitors (per gender) participating at the games per sport/discipline.

Beach Handball

Men's 
Summary

Squad

Round Robin

Round Robin

Semifinal

Bronze Medal Match

Women's 
Summary

Squad

Round Robin

Round Robin

Semifinal

Gold Medal Match

Beach Football

Men's 
Summary

Squad

Round Robin

Round Robin

Bronze Medal Match

Beach Tennis

Beach Volleyball

Beach Wrestling

Open Water Swimming

Sailing

Skateboarding

Surf

References 

2022 in Mexican sports